Terk may refer to:

 Sonia Terk (1885–1979), Ukrainian-born French artist
 Terk (musician), former member of Whistle (band)
 Terk v. Gordon, a 1978 United States Supreme Court case
 Terk, a brand owned by Voxx International
 Terk, local name for the Terek River, in the northern Caucasus mountains

See also
 Turk (disambiguation)